Batman is a surname of English origin. It originates from Saint Bartholomew and means "a friend or servant of Bart." Similar names Bateman, Baitman and Battman have the same origin. The similar name Bathemans is recorded as early as 1222. The name has no connection to the mammal or the fictional superhero.

People with the name
Stephen Batman (fl. 1534–1584), English translator and author
John Batman (1801–1839), one of the founders of Melbourne, Australia 
Ira Coleman Batman (1862–1934), American jurist and politician 
Daniel Batman (1981–2012), Australian sprinter
Fereydoon Batmanghelidj (1931–2004), known as Dr. Batman, advocate of water as a cure-all

See also
Batman (disambiguation)
Batman v. Commissioner, a US court case involving Ray and Gerald Batman
Jacques-Louis Battmann (1818–1886), French organist and composer

References